Bowen Field at Peters Park is a stadium in Bluefield, Virginia, United States. Primarily used for baseball, it is the home field for Bluefield Ridge Runners of the summer collegiate Appalachian League and the Bluefield University Rams baseball team. It previously hosted the Bluefield Orioles and the Bluefield Blue Jays of Minor League Baseball from 1939 to 2020. It was built in 1939 during the Great Depression as a WPA project, and it was rebuilt in 1975 after a fire. It holds 3,000 people. Seats are from the Anaheim Stadium and were installed in 1990s.

The stadium is located in the city park of Bluefield, West Virginia, and is operated by the West Virginia city. However, the park straddles the Virginia–West Virginia state line, and Bowen Field lies completely on the Virginia side of the park.

The Blue Jays added "Peters Park" to the ballpark name in May 2017, in honor of a local Bluefield donor, Charles Peters.

References

External links
 Bowen Field Views – Ball Parks of the Minor Leagues

Minor league baseball venues
Baseball venues in West Virginia
Baseball venues in Virginia
Tourist attractions in Mercer County, West Virginia
Buildings and structures in Tazewell County, Virginia
College baseball venues in the United States
Buildings and structures completed in 1939
1939 establishments in Virginia
Bluefield, West Virginia